Aleksandr Yermilov (born 12 November 1960) is a Soviet flatwater kayaker/sprint canoer who competed in the early 1980s. He won four medal at the ICF Canoe Sprint World Championships with three golds (K-4 10000 m: 1981 in Nottingham, Great Britain, 1982 in Belgrade, Yugoslavia; 1983 in Tampere, Finland) and a silver (K-4 1000 m: 1981).

He was born in Kharkiv, Ukraine. In the 1990s he immigrated to Israel. Then to Canada.

References
Inline

General

Living people
Soviet male canoeists
1960 births
Kayakers
Sportspeople from Kharkiv
Ukrainian male canoeists
ICF Canoe Sprint World Championships medalists in kayak
Honoured Masters of Sport of the USSR